The 2017–18 New Jersey Devils season was the 44th season for the National Hockey League franchise that was established on June 11, 1974, and 36th season since the franchise relocated from Colorado prior to the 1982–83 NHL season. The Devils received the first overall pick in the 2017 NHL Entry Draft for the first time in franchise history by winning the draft lottery held on April 29, 2017. They used this pick to select Nico Hischier who was also the first Swiss player to be selected first overall. Taylor Hall set a Devils record for the longest point streak at 26 games, which is also the longest point streak in the 2017–18 season. The team also set their best start in franchise history, going 9–2–0 in their first 11 games of the season. This season also saw the team trade Adam Henrique in exchange for Sami Vatanen and also acquired Patrick Maroon and Michael Grabner. The season also saw the franchise successfully make it back to the Stanley Cup playoffs for the first time since 2012. The Devils would lose to the Tampa Bay Lightning 4–1 in the First Round.

Standings

Divisional standings

Conference standings

Schedule and results

Preseason
The preseason schedule was published on June 11, 2017, which includes seven games (two at home and five as visitors).

Regular season
The regular season schedule was released on June 22, 2017.

Playoffs

Player statistics
As of April 16, 2018

Skaters

Goaltenders

Awards and honors

Awards

Transactions
The Devils have been involved in the following transactions during the 2017–18 season.

Trades

Free agents acquired

Free agents lost

Claimed via waivers

Lost via waivers

Players released

Lost via retirement

Player signings

Draft picks

Below are the New Jersey Devils' selections at the 2017 NHL Entry Draft, which was held on June 23 and 24, 2017, at the United Center in Chicago, Illinois.

Notes:
 The Colorado Avalanche's third-round pick went the New Jersey Devils as the result of a trade on February 29, 2016, that sent Eric Gelinas to Colorado in exchange for this pick.
 The San Jose Sharks' third-round pick went to the New Jersey Devils as compensation for San Jose signing Peter DeBoer as their head coach on May 28, 2015.
 The San Jose Sharks' fifth-round pick went to the New Jersey Devils as the result of a trade on June 17, 2017 that sent Boston's second-round pick and Nashville's fourth-round pick both in 2017 to San Jose in exchange for Mirco Mueller and this pick.

References

New Jersey Devils seasons
New Jersey Devils
New Jersey Devils
New Jersey Devils
New Jersey Devils
21st century in Newark, New Jersey